The following is a timeline of the history of the city of Abidjan, Ivory Coast.

Prior to 20th century

 1898 - Village of Abidjan founded.

20th century

 1903 - Abidjan becomes a town.
 1910 - Dimbokro-Abidjan railway constructed.
 1920 - Population: 1,000.
 1927 - Port-Bouët wharf commissioned.
 1934
 French administrative capital relocated to Abidjan from Bingerville.
 Bobo-Dioulasso-Abidjan railway constructed.
 1938 - Theatre Indigene formed.
 1942 - Museum established.
 1945 - City council election held.
 1946 - Population: 48,000.
 1948 - ASEC Mimosas football club formed.
 1950 - Vridi Canal opens.
 1951 - Autonomous Port of Abidjan in operation.
 1952
 Bibliothèque municipale established.
 Stade Andre Geo opens.
 1953 - Banco National Park and Stella Club d'Adjamé (football club) established.
 1954 - Abidjan Matin newspaper begins publication.
 1955
 Ouagadougou-Abidjan railway begins operating.
 Catholic Archdiocese of Abidjan established.
 Population: 127,585.
 1956
 Municipality established.
 Félix Houphouët-Boigny becomes mayor.
 City Hall built.
 1958
 1st bridge completed connecting the mainland to Petit-Bassam Island.
 1960
 City becomes capital of independent Republic of Côte d'Ivoire.
 Antoine Konan Kanga becomes mayor.
 Abidjan Transport Company founded.
 1961 - Centre d'Edition et de Diffusion Africaines established.
 1962
 Presidential palace inaugurated.
 Institut Africain pour le Développement économique et Social headquartered in Abidjan.
 Centre Culturel Français active.
 1963
 Radio Télévision Ivoirienne (television) begins broadcasting.
 Population: 246,700 urban agglomeration.
 1964 - Fraternité Matin newspaper begins publication.
 1965
  African Development Bank headquartered in Abidjan.
 Nour-al-Hayat Mall built.
 1967
 Charles de Gaulle bridge built.
 Higher Institute of Religious Culture founded.
 1968 - National Library of Ivory Coast established.
 1969 - Ivoire InterContinental Abidjan Hotel built.
 1971 - Abidjan Institute of Criminology established (approximate date).
 1972 - International Community School of Abidjan founded.
 1974 - Abidjan Stock Exchange established.
 1975 - Population: 951,216.
 1976 - Ivorian Society of Bank building and Department of Finances building constructed.
 1978
 Palais des Sports de Treichville established.
 Population: 1,269,071.
 1980
 City of Abidjan organized into ten communes: Abobo, Adjamé, Attécoubé, Cocody, Koumassi, Marcory, Plateau, Port-Bouët, Treichville, Yopougon.
 Emmanuel Dioulo becomes mayor.
 1983 - Political capital of Ivory Coast relocated from Abidjan to Yamoussoukro.
 1984
 March: 1984 African Cup of Nations held.
 Cité Administrative Tour C, D and E built.
 1985
 St. Paul's Cathedral, Abidjan built.
 Ernest N’Koumo Mobio becomes mayor.
 Population: 1,716,000 (urban agglomeration).
 1986 - Sister city relationship established with San Francisco, USA.
 1988
 Maquis du Val eatery opens.
 Population: 1,934,342.
 1990
 Demonstration against Houphouët-Boigny national regime.
 Population: 2,102,000 (urban agglomeration).
 1992 - African Publishers Network headquartered in city.
 1993 - Marche des Arts et du Spectacle Africains (festival) begins.
 1994 -  newspaper begins publication.
 1995
 Abidjan-Ouagadougou railway concessioned.
 Population: 2,535,000 (urban agglomeration).
 1996
 Université d'Abobo-Adjamé founded.
 Inades-Formation Côte d'Ivoire relocated to Abidjan.
 1998
 West African regional Bourse Régionale des Valeurs Mobilières (stock exchange) headquartered in Abidjan.
 Population: 2,877,948.
 1999 -  built.
 2000
 Area of city: 627 square kilometers.
 Population: 3,028,000 (urban agglomeration).

21st century

 2001 - August: City administration decentralized into 13 communes: Abobo, Adjamé, Anyama, Attécoubé, Bingerville, Cocody, Koumassi, Marcory, Plateau, Port-Bouët, Songon, Treichville, Yopougon.
 2002
 September: First Ivorian Civil War begins.
 Pierre Djédji Amondji becomes Abidjan district governor.
 2003 - December: "Attack on state TV building."
 2004
 March: Political protest; violence ensues.
 November: Anti-French riots.
 Anoumabo Open Theatre built.
 2005 - Population: 3,564,000 (urban agglomeration).
 2007 - Ivory Coast National Film Festival begins.
 2008 -  (bridge) construction begins.
 2009
 29 March: 2009 Houphouët-Boigny stampede.
 Unite de Police Anti-Pollution active.
 University of Science and Technology of Ivory Coast established.
 2010
 November: Pre-election unrest.
 December: Political protest.
 City website online (approximate date).
 Population: 4,151,000 (urban agglomeration).
 2011
 February: Protest in Abobo against Gbagbo regime.
 March: Second Ivorian Civil War begins.
 April: "French army take over Abidjan's airport."
 May: Robert Beugré Mambé becomes Abidjan district governor.
 2012
 May: TEDx Abidjan begins.
 November: Association Internationale des Maires Francophones conference held.
 Population: 4,476,397.
 2013
 1 January: 2013 Houphouët-Boigny stampede.
 Yamoussoukro-Abidjan highway built.
 InnovAfrica meets in Abidjan.
 2014
 Henri Konan Bédié Bridge opens.
 Population: 4,395,243.
 2017 - July: 2017 Jeux de la Francophonie to be held in Abidjan.

See also
 Abidjan history

References

This article incorporates information from the French Wikipedia and the German Wikipedia.

Bibliography

in English

in French
  
  
 
 
 
 
 
 
 
  
  (contains several chapters about Abidjan)

External links

   (Bibliography of open access  articles)
  (Images, etc.)
  (Images, etc.)
  (Bibliography)
  (Bibliography)
  (Bibliography)
  (Bibliography)

Images

Abidjan
Abidjan
Abidjan
abidjan
Years in Ivory Coast